Angel Delivery Service is the major label debut by the German band Emil Bulls. It was released on June 4, 2001 and produced, as would their next record be, by Wolfgang Stach.

Track listing
All songs written by Emil Bulls except "Take On Me" by Magne Furuholmen, Morten Harket and Pål Waaktaar of the Norwegian group A-ha.

All lyrics are by Christoph von Freydorf except "Style School" (by von Freydorf and Paul Rzyttka) and "Take on Me" (by Furuholmen, Harket and Waakaar).

Original Edition
"Angel Delivery" – 3:00
"Style School" – 3:24
"Smells Like Rock'N'Roll" – 3:32
"Leaving You With This" – 4:18
"Water (A Snapshot)" – 3:17
"Chickeria" – 3:10
"Mirror (Me)" – 4:08
"Hi It's Me, Christ" – 3:47
"Monogamy" – 5:10
"Resurrected" – 4:49
"Tomorrow I'll Be Back Home" – 3:18
"Wheels Of Steel" – 6:29
"Quiet Night" – 6:17

Second Edition
"Angel Delivery" – 3:01
"Style School" – 3:25
"Smells Like Rock'N'Roll" – 3:30
"Leaving You With This" – 4:16
"Water (A Snapshot)" – 3:10
"Chickeria" – 3:19
"Mirror (Me)" – 4:07
"Hi It's Me, Christ" – 3:44
"Monogamy" – 5:18
"Resurrected" – 4:48
"Tomorrow I'll Be Back Home" – 3:16
"Wheels Of Steel" – 6:20
"Quiet Night" – 6:15
"Take on Me" – 3:36

Personnel
Christoph von Freydorf – vocals, guitar
James Richardson – bass (credited as Citnoh)
Stefan Finauer – drums (credited as Graint)
Stephan Karl – guitar (credited as M-Oikal)
Christian Schneider – guitar (credited as Ricky Glam)
Paul Rzyttka – deejay, synth (credited as DJ Zamzoe)
Pain In The Ass – guest vocals (on "Tomorrow I'll Be Back Home")
Mathias "Jablonski" Elsholz (TAE) – guest vocals (on "Wheels of Steel")
Dirk Riegener – programming, string arrangement (on "Monogamy")
Marcel Mader –percussion
Wolfgang Stach – producer, audio engineer, tambourine (credited as Wolfgang "Stackman" Stach)
Oliver Sroweleit – audio engineer
Clemens Matznic – audio engineer
Pelle Henricsson – mixer, mastering
Eskil Lõvstrõm – mixer
Mathias Bothor – photography

References

2001 albums
Emil Bulls albums